William Charles Schwartz (April 22, 1884 – August 29, 1961) was a Major League Baseball first baseman who played for one season. He played for the Cleveland Naps for 24 games during the 1904 Cleveland Naps season. He coached the Southern Association Nashville Vols from 1911 to 1915.

References

External links

1884 births
1961 deaths
Major League Baseball first basemen
Cleveland Naps players
Indianapolis Indians players
Akron Rubbernecks players
Akron Champs players
Nashville Vols players
Vanderbilt Commodores baseball coaches
Baseball players from Cleveland